The name Namtheun has been used to name four tropical cyclones in the northwestern Pacific Ocean. This name was contributed by Laos and is a river (Nam Theun).
 Typhoon Namtheun (2004) (T0410, 13W) – struck Japan.
 Tropical Storm Namtheun (2010) (T1008, 09W)
 Typhoon Namtheun (2016) (T1612, 15W, Enteng) - struck Japan.
 Severe Tropical Storm Namtheun (2021) (T2119, 23W)

Pacific typhoon set index articles